Péter Horváth (born 30 August 1974 in Budapest) is a former swimmer from Hungary. He swam for Hungary at the:
Olympics: 1992, 1996, 2000, 2004
World Championships: 1994, 1998, 2003
European Championships: 1991, 1993, 1995, 1997

References

1974 births
Living people
Hungarian male swimmers
Olympic swimmers of Hungary
Male backstroke swimmers
Male butterfly swimmers
Swimmers at the 1992 Summer Olympics
Swimmers at the 1996 Summer Olympics
Swimmers at the 2000 Summer Olympics
Swimmers at the 2004 Summer Olympics
Swimmers from Budapest
World Aquatics Championships medalists in swimming
European Aquatics Championships medalists in swimming
20th-century Hungarian people
21st-century Hungarian people